The 1942–43 Southern League Cup was the third edition of the regional war-time football tournament.

Group stage

Group A

Group B

Group C

Group D

Semi-finals

Final

Teams

References

External links
Southern League Cup at Scottish Football Historical Archive (archived version, 2009)

season
1942–43 in Scottish football